Betty Wright: The Movie is a musical album, a collaboration by singer Betty Wright and The Roots. It was released on November 15, 2011.

Background
Although this was the first album Wright released in almost ten years, she spent time writing, singing back up, arranging, and producing songs for several artists including Keyshia Cole, Diddy, Joss Stone, Kelly Clarkson, and Lil Wayne. She teamed up with The Roots for several studio sessions to bring forth this project. All songs were either written or co-written by Wright herself.

Singles
The lead single for the album is the upbeat performance of "Grapes on a Vine" featuring Lil Wayne.

Release
The album was released on November 15, 2011 by S-Curve Records. It has received generally positive reviews by critics with Metascore giving it a 73 out of 100. It was listed as #6 on Associated Press's best albums of 2011.

Track listing

References

2011 albums
Betty Wright albums
The Roots albums
Contemporary R&B albums by American artists